Operation Shylock: A Confession is a 1993 novel by American novelist Philip Roth.

Plot
The novel follows narrator "Philip Roth" on a journey to Israel, where he attends the trial of accused war criminal John Demjanjuk and becomes involved in an intelligence mission—the "Operation Shylock" of the title.

While in Israel, the narrator seeks out an impersonator who has appropriated his identity—sharing the same facial features and name as Philip Roth—and used this celebrity to spread "Diasporism," a counter-Zionist ideology advocating the return of Israeli Jews to their European nations of exile. The ensuing struggle between this doppelgänger-like stranger and "Roth," played against the backdrop of the Demjanjuk trial and the First Intifada, constitutes the book's primary storyline.

Connections
A major concern of Roth's fiction since the 1970s has been the relationship between a novelist's life and work. Though this topic is thoroughly explored in Roth's series of Zuckerman novels, Operation Shylock even more radically attacks the distinction between art and life by making a fairly mimetic version of the author the protagonist of an obviously invented (though plausible) story.

Despite this effort, separating the real from the fictional in Operation Shylock is not wholly impossible. For example, several minor characters from the novel are actual people including John Demjanjuk, Claire Bloom, and Israeli writer and Roth friend Aharon Appelfeld. The post-operative nervous breakdown mentioned in the prologue and in other books by or about Roth was drawn from Roth's real-life experience of the temporary side-effects of a post-operative sedative (triazolam) which was later banned in several countries after discovery that the manufacturer had not published studies showing a high risk of short term psychiatric disturbance.

Roth's "confession"
In March 1993, Roth maintained the veracity of his novel to The New York Times'''  Esther B. Fein, who wrote, "Operation Shylock, Roth insists with a post-modern straight face, is a 'confession,' not a novel, and he means for us to take this every bit as seriously as the contents labels demanded by the strictures of the Food and Drug Administration. 'The book is true,' Roth said the other day. 'As you know, at the end of the book a Mossad operative made me realize it was in my interest to say this book was fiction. And I became quite convinced that it was in my interest to do that. So I added the note to the reader as I was asked to do. I'm just a good Mossadnik.'"

Reception
Roth's long-time professional acquaintance John Updike gave the novel a famously caustic review in The New Yorker. Updike found the book "an orgy of argumentation...this hard-pressed reviewer was reminded not only of Shaw but of Hamlet, which also has too many characters, numerous long speeches, and a vacillating, maddening hero who in the end shows the right stuff." Updike closed with the admonition, "It should be read by anyone who cares about (1) Israel and its repercussions, (2) the development of the postmodern, deconstruction-minded novel, (3) Philip Roth." In The New York Times Book Review, novelist and poet D. M. Thomas called the novel "an impassioned quarrel...Despite the seriousness of its theme, the book carries the feeling of creative joy. One feels that Roth feels that he's let rip."

The novel appears to have grown in stature since publication. In 2006, when New York Times Book Review editor Sam Tanenhaus mailed a short letter to "a couple of hundred prominent writers, critics, editors," asking that they identify the best work of American fiction published in the preceding quarter-century, several respondents named Operation Shylock.  (The eventual winner was Toni Morrison's 1987 Beloved.) Reporting upon Roth's reception of the 2011 Man Booker International Prize, critic Jonathan Derbyshire of the New Statesman wrote, "The judging panel make the inevitable reference in their summing-up to Roth's extraordinary fecundity over the past 15 years or so, at a stage in his life when 'most novelists are in decline'. The most notable fruits of Roth's Indian summer, 1995's Sabbath's Theater and American Pastoral, published two years later, are certainly among his most luminous achievements. But two slightly earlier novels stand out for me, both of them hectically metafictional works partly set in Israel: The Counterlife (1986) and Operation Shylock."

After Roth's passing, The New York Times asked several prominent writers to name their favorite book by him. Daniel Mendelsohn cast his vote for Operation Shylock, writing: "Here, the coruscating linguistic brilliance, the profanity and playfulness (and the deep, often irritated engagement with Jewishness) that characterizes his earlier novels rise to new — and, I would say, philosophical — heights. For the two Roths finally meet in a Jerusalem that is anxiously hosting the trial of John Demjanjuk, the Ukrainian-born Ohio autoworker who was revealed to have been a sadistic guard at a Nazi death camp: a setting that amplifies the significance of Roth’s favorite themes of identity and imposture, truth and fictionality, and gives the ostensibly zany, Quixote-esque plot an ultimately tragic historical resonance."

AwardsOperation Shylock received the 1993 PEN/Faulkner Award for best novel.  Roth would eventually become the first three-time winner of the award: for Shylock, 2001's The Human Stain, and 2007's Everyman''.

References

External links
 Roth on Operation Shylock in The New York Times
 D.M. Thomas on Operation Shylock in The New York Times Book Review

1993 American novels
Novels by Philip Roth
Metafictional novels
Novels set in Israel
American spy novels
Simon & Schuster books
PEN/Faulkner Award for Fiction-winning works